Maharat Nakhon Ratchasima Hospital is the main hospital of Nakhon Ratchasima Province, Thailand and is classified under the Ministry of Public Health as a regional hospital. It is the largest regional hospital in Thailand under the responsibility of the ministry and has 1,387 beds. It has a CPIRD Medical Education Center which mainly trains medical students in the MOPH-Mahidol CPIRD Program of Mahidol University, as well as being an affiliated hospital to the Faculty of Medicine Ramathibodi Hospital, Mahidol University, Phramongkutklao College of Medicine.

History 
Following the setup of sukhaphiban in Nakhon Ratchasima Province under the reign of King Chulalongkorn, two hospitals were built in the local area:
 Sukhaphiban 1 Hospital treating general patients at Pho Klang Subdistrict
 Sukhaphiban 2 Hospital treating patients with infectious diseases at Suan Mon Subdistrict
Sukhaphiban 1 Hospital was then merged into Sukhaphiban 2 Hospital and renamed 'Suan Mon Hospital'.

On 1 February 1935, Suan Mon Hospital was transferred from the responsibility of Sukhaphiban Hospitals Organisation to Nakhon Ratchasima City Municipality and the hospital was renamed 'Nakhon Ratchasima City Municipality Hospital'. On 1 September 1954, operations were transferred to the Ministry of Public Health and renamed 'Nakhon Ratchasima City Hospital', and was categorised as a provincial hospital. In 1974, the hospital was re-categorised as a regional hospital. On 5 September 1981, the hospital was renamed by the Ministry of Public Health as 'Maharat Nakhon Ratchasima Hospital' in honour of King Bhumibol Adulyadej.

See also 
Healthcare in Thailand
 Hospitals in Thailand
 List of hospitals in Thailand

References 

 Article incorporates material from the corresponding article in the Thai Wikipedia

Hospitals in Thailand
Buildings and structures in Nakhon Ratchasima